Wen Shizhen (January 1940 – 27 July 2021) was a Chinese politician who served as governor of Liaoning from 1994 to 1998, party chief of Liaoning from 1997 to 2004, and chairman of the Standing Committee of Liaoning People's Congress from 2003 to 2005. He was a delegate to the 11th National People's Congress. He was a member of the 15th and 16th Central Committee of the Chinese Communist Party. He was a delegate to the 19th National Congress of the Chinese Communist Party.

Early life and education
Wen was born in Haicheng County, Fengtian Province, Manchukuo (now Liaoning, China), in January 1940. He secondary studied at Shenyang No.5 High School. In 1960, he was admitted to Dalian University of Technology, majoring in mechanical manufacturing. After graduating in 1965, he was despatched to the Dalian Oil Pump and Nozzle Factory, where he finally was its factory manager.

Career
He joined the Chinese Communist Party in December 1979. He was deputy director of Dalian Machinery Industry Bureau in 1982 and one year later became deputy director of Liaoning Machinery Industry Department. In 1985, he was assistant governor of Liaoning, but having held the position for only one year,  he was appointed vice governor and deputy party chief of Liaoning. In August 1995, he was elected governor of Liaoning on the First Session of the 8th Liaoning People's Congress, and held that office until 1998. In August 1997, he was appointed party chief of Liaoning, a position he held until December 2004. He became chairman of the Standing Committee of Liaoning People's Congress in January 2003, and served until February 2005.

In February 2005, he was appointed vice chairperson of the National People's Congress Financial and Economic Affairs Committee, serving in the post until his retirement in 2013.

Death
He died of illness in Beijing on 27 July 2021, aged 81. On 31 July 2021, he was buried in Huilonggang Revolutionary Cemetery in Shenyang, Liaoning.

References

1940 births
2021 deaths
People from Haicheng, Liaoning
Dalian University of Technology alumni
People's Republic of China politicians from Liaoning
Chinese Communist Party politicians from Liaoning
Delegates to the 11th National People's Congress
Members of the 15th Central Committee of the Chinese Communist Party
Members of the 16th Central Committee of the Chinese Communist Party